Proezas de Satanás na Vila de Leva e Tráz (Satan's Feats in the Village of Leva-e-Traz) is a 1967 Brazilian film directed by Paulo Gil Soares.
It is considered part of the Cinema Novo movement in Brazil, where social commentary about modern progress and development is thinly disguised as a Horror film (in this case).

Cast 
Emmanuel Cavalcanti	...	One-armed Man
Joffre Soares	...	Blind Man
Isabella	...	Devout Woman
Joel Barcellos	...	Catcher of Souls
Thelma Reston	...	(as Telma Reston)
Zózimo Bulbul
Joseph Guerreiro	...	Priest
Paulo Broitma	...	Knight

Awards 
1967: Brasília Film Festival
Best Film (won)
Best Screenplay (won) 
Best Music (won)

References

External links 
 

1967 films
1960s Portuguese-language films
Brazilian comedy films